Government Secondary School, Rani formerly known as Government Middle School, Rani is a government level school in East Siang District, Arunachal Pradesh. The School Has been established in the year 1964 as a Middle School, and upgraded to Secondary Level in the year 2013.

Notable alumni
Tangor Tapak Politician and Former Minister of Health & Family Welfare of Arunachal Pradesh.

References

High schools and secondary schools in Arunachal Pradesh
East Siang district
1964 establishments in the North-East Frontier Agency
Educational institutions established in 1964